The South African Railways Class  is a diesel-electric locomotive.

Between June 1975 and 1981, the South African Railways placed 124 Class  General Electric type SG10B diesel-electric locomotives in service.

Manufacturer
The Class  type GE SG10B diesel-electric locomotive was designed by General Electric (GE) and built for the South African Railways (SAR) in three batches by the South African General Electric-Dorman Long Locomotive Group (SA GE-DL, later Dorbyl). The first one hundred locomotives were delivered between June 1975 and September 1978, numbered in the range from 36-001 to 36-100. These were followed in 1981 by two batches of twenty and four locomotives respectively, numbered in the ranges from 36-101 to 36-120 and 36-121 to  respectively.

Class 36 series
The Class 36 locomotive family consists of two series, the GE type SG10B Class  and the General Motors Electro-Motive Division (GM-EMD) type SW1002 Class . Both manufacturers also produced locomotives for the South African Classes 33, 34 and 35.

Characteristics

The Class  is a general purpose locomotive which is equipped with two station controls for bi-directional operation. It is used mainly for yard shunting and pickup work to service industrial customers.

Their large cab windows were designed to afford the crew the maximum all-round field of vision, but in South African summer months the sun can cause much discomfort in the cab. It is not unusual to find a locomotive on yard work with the sun-side windows covered with newspaper taped onto the insides. A few Class  locomotives have been observed at Vereeniging and at Port Elizabeth with home depot-applied modifications to their cab roofs in the form of sheetmetal roof extensions to the front and rear to serve as sun-shades.

Service
When placed in service, they were initially distributed for service between Natal and the Western Transvaal, but they were later exchanged with Class 36-200 units from the Western and Eastern Cape, the Free State and Western Transvaal where they are still serving.

Works numbers
The Class 36-000 builder’s works numbers and years built are shown in the table.

Liveries
The Class 36-000 were all delivered in the SAR Gulf Red livery with signal red buffer beams, yellow side stripes on the long hood sides and a yellow V on each end. In the 1990s many of the units began to be repainted in the Spoornet orange livery with a yellow and blue chevron pattern on the buffer beams. From 2007 many were repainted in the Spoornet blue livery with outline numbers on the long hood sides. After 2008 in the Transnet Freight Rail (TFR) and Passenger Rail Agency of South Africa (PRASA) era, many were repainted in the TFR red, green and yellow livery and at least one was repainted in the PRASA blue livery.

Class 91-000

Bogies and traction motors from Class  locomotives were often used under the  narrow gauge Class  GE UM6B diesel-electric locomotives when they were being transferred between the Cape and Natal narrow gauge systems. Bigfoot bogies were also used under the narrow gauge locomotives whenever they had to be exchanged for maintenance purposes, sometimes running under their own power, sometimes hauled dead.

After most of the Class  narrow gauge locomotives were withdrawn, one of them was allocated to the Swartkops electric locomotive depot in Port Elizabeth for use as shunting engine. It was also running on Class  bogies, but with only one bogie powered.

Illustration
The main picture shows no. 36-013 in Transnet Freight Rail livery approaching Rugby in Milnerton from Table Bay Harbour on 4 November 2013. Other liveries which were applied to Class  locomotives and the sun-shade depot modification are illustrated below.

References

3470
Bo-Bo locomotives
General Electric locomotives
Dorbyl locomotives
Cape gauge railway locomotives
Railway locomotives introduced in 1975
1975 in South Africa